Rescue and Partnership Party is a centrist political party in Jordan founded in late 2017. Its members split off from the Muslim Brotherhood's Islamic Action Front. The Party does not call for an Islamic state.

References

External links
 Facebook page

Political parties in Jordan
Centrist parties in Asia
Political parties established in 2017
2017 establishments in Jordan